"Years Ago" is a song written by Don Reid, and recorded by American country music group The Statler Brothers.  It was released in October 1981 as the third single and title track from the album Years Ago.  The song reached #12 on the Billboard Hot Country Single & Tracks chart.

Chart performance

References

1981 singles
1981 songs
The Statler Brothers songs
Songs written by Don Reid (singer)
Song recordings produced by Jerry Kennedy
Mercury Records singles